Patricia Elizabeth Campos Herrera (born 17 March 1987) is a Salvadoran footballer who plays as a forward. She has been a member of the El Salvador women's national team.

International career
Campos capped for El Salvador at senior level during the 2010 CONCACAF Women's World Cup Qualifying qualification.

International goals
Scores and results list El Salvador's goal tally first.

See also
List of El Salvador women's international footballers

References

1987 births
Living people
Salvadoran women's footballers
Women's association football forwards
El Salvador women's international footballers